The Gomontiellaceae are a family of cyanobacteria.

The genus name of Gomontiella is in honour of Maurice-Augustin Gomont (1839 - 1909), who was a French phycologist.

The genus was circumscribed by Emanoil Constantin Teodoresco in Verh. K.K. Zool.-Bot. Ges. Wien vol.52 on page 760 in 1901.

References

Oscillatoriales
Cyanobacteria families